Parliamentary elections were held in Georgia on 1 October 2012. The opposition Georgian Dream coalition of billionaire businessman Bidzina Ivanishvili won a majority of the seats. President Mikheil Saakashvili conceded his party's defeat.

The elections were held in accordance with a reformed electoral system agreed upon by the government and several opposition parties in 2011. 77 of the 150 seats were allocated proportionally to party lists, the remaining 73 to the winners in single-member constituencies. The new parliament was relocated from the capital of Tbilisi to the country's second largest city of Kutaisi later, in 2012. A new government was also formed following the 2013 presidential election as envisaged by the 2010 constitutional amendments. South Ossetia and Abkhazia did not vote.

Background

Protests

In 2009, opposition parties together held protests to demand the resignation of President Mikheil Saakashvili accusing him of concentrating power to himself, using riot police to crush opposition rallies in 2007. Protests seeking the president's resignation were suppressed once again in 2011.

2010 constitutional amendments
According to the amendments to the Constitution of Georgia passed on 15 October 2010, the Parliament elected in 2012 would have to form a new government after the constitutional amendments entered into force upon the inauguration of the next president, who was to be elected in October 2013. The amendments envisaged significant reduction of the powers of President in favor of Prime Minister of Georgia and the government. According to another amendment, passed on 1 July 2011, the parliament elected in 2012 would be permanently relocated from Tbilisi to the country's second largest city of Kutaisi.

2010–2011 electoral reform talks
In November 2010, the United National Movement and several opposition parties launched talks in order to develop a new electoral system. On 27 June 2011, the UNM succeeded in getting a majority of the votes for its proposed electoral system reform, effectively splintering the Group of Eight opposition coalition. Two members of the coalition — the Christian-Democratic Movement (CDM), and the New Rights, as well as two other opposition parties – the National-Democratic Party, and On Our Own — signed a deal with the UNM on a reformed electoral system, envisaging, among other provisions, an increase in the number of parliamentary seats up to 190 (83 majoritarian and 107 proportional seats). Six of the former coalition members — National Forum, Our Georgia – Free Democrats (OGFD), Conservative Party, Republican Party, Georgia's Way, and the People's Party — refused to join the deal and unveiled a new alliance on 8 July, though it collapsed on 6 October.

Parties

United National Movement
Bloc: Georgian Dream
Georgian Dream-Democratic Georgia
Republican Party of Georgia
Our Georgia – Free Democrats
National Forum
Conservative Party of Georgia
Industry Will Save Georgia
Bloc: Christian-Democratic Union
Christian-Democratic Movement
European Democrats
Georgian Labour Party
New Rights
Free Georgia
National Democratic Party
Movement For a Fair Georgia
People’s Movement
Tavisupleba (Freedom – Path of Zviad Gamsakhuridia)
Kartuli Dasi
Peoples Party
Merab Kostava Society
Future Georgia
Workers’ Council of Georgia
Union of Georgian Sportsmen

Campaign
Democratic Movement – United Georgia, a radical opposition party led by Nino Burjanadze, which had refused to join the electoral reform talks, was behind the May 21–26, 2011 rallies, which ended with a clash with police, leaving four dead.

On 7 October 2011, Bidzina Ivanishvili, a multi-billionaire businessman and philanthropist, who had formerly been on good terms with the authorities, stirred up the political scene of Georgia by unleashing criticism of the Saakashvili government and announcing his intention to establish a political party and to run in the 2012 parliamentary elections. He named the Republican Party, led by David Usupashvili, and Our Georgia – Free Democrats, led by Irakli Alasania, among his future partners. In a written statement, Ivanishvili revealed that, beyond dual Georgian and Russian citizenship, he also had a French passport. As a result, the Georgian civil registry agency ruled his Georgian citizenship had become invalid. According to the law, only Georgian citizens can set up or fund a political party. In May 2012, the parliament voted to allow European Union citizens to become MPs. On 27 May 2012, Ivanishvili and his Georgian Dream alliance announced the start of the campaign, drawing tens of thousands of supporters in a large anti-government rally in downtown Tbilisi.

Because Ivanishvili was unsatisfied with the format proposed for the country's public TV broadcaster's election debates on September 9 and September 18, his Georgian Dream coalition refused to take part in them - the country's first such events. Ivanishvili would not debate prime minister Vano Merabishvili and would meet only Mikheil Saakashvili, saying: "I respect Vano, but [debates with him] will not work”.

Demonstrations

After the screening of a video on Maestro TV and Ivanishvili's TV9 channel, showing torture in a Georgian prison, demonstrators called for Saakashvili's resignation. While the video was labeled as having been made by "politically motivated persons," the national prosecutor's office announced the arrests of 10 people, including the head of the Prison No.8 in Tbilisi, two deputies and prison guards. The interior minister, Bacho Akhalaia, resigned, as well as the Corrections and Legal Assistance Minister, Khatuna Kalmakhelidze. Saakashvili said: "Tonight, I tell all the victims of these inhuman actions and the whole nation that the Georgia we have built and we are all building together shall not and will not tolerate such behaviour - in its prisons or anywhere else. Those who committed these crimes will spend long years in jail, as will those who bribed guards to stage these horrors and film them." At a televised meeting later with prime minister Merabishvili, justice minister Zurab Adeishvili, prosecutor-general Murtaz Zodelava and new prisons service chief Giorgi Lortkipanidze, he called for reforms, saying: "This system, the way it is now, should be entirely abolished." It was, he added, "an emergency" and he ordered that patrol police officers should perform prison duties until reforms were enacted.

Foreign support
The foreign ministers of Bulgaria, the Czech Republic, Latvia, Lithuania and Romania arrived in Georgia on 17 September in support of the democratic process, political reforms in the country and Georgia's "Euro-Atlantic integration." They were due to meet with President Saakashvili, Speaker of Parliament David Bakradze, Secretary of the National Security Council Giga Bokeria, unnamed opposition figures and the EU's electoral Monitoring Mission. This followed a visit by the foreign ministers of Sweden and Poland the previous week in order to discuss preparations for the election with unnamed national leaders and opposition figures.

Electoral observers
The OSCE electoral observer team's Tonino Picula said on 23 August said his organization's monitors "had seen a growing political polarization in the country. They were particularly concerned by the practice of the State Audit Office of using broad discretionary authority to investigate the legality of individual or party spending and making questionable decisions and imposing harsh penalties without clear or transparent guidelines. The fines levied were disproportionate and apparently being applied in a selective manner mainly targeting one political subject". President of the OSCE Parliamentary Assembly Riccardo Migliori added that "there was little part of Leninism in Georgian electoral campaign, rather than presenting programs, they were trying to destroy their enemies."

Results

Party Vote

By region

By constituency

Constituency Vote

Reactions
On the day after the elections, President Saakashvili conceded that his United National Movement had been defeated. He announced that power would be transferred to a new government formed by the victorious Georgian Dream coalition. Georgian Dream leader Ivanishvili called on the president to resign to avoid a "sort of dual power situation," but took back this demand on the day after. The opposition coalition formed a three-person working group to consult with the outgoing executives over a smooth shift of power. On 4 October, the UNM formed a four-member team to negotiate with the incoming parliamentary majority.

Georgian Dream activists gathered in front of some District Election Commissions in constituencies where UNM candidates were leading, according to official preliminary results. The chairman of the Central Election Commission, Zurab Kharatishvili, complained that electoral commissioners had been intimidated. Prominent Georgian Dream politician Irakli Alasania claimed there had been manipulations in some precincts. Representatives of the joint opposition list challenged the official figures and asserted that Georgian Dream had won more seats than announced by the Electoral Commission. However, on 4 October Ivanishvili prompted his supporters to halt their protests in front of District Election Commissions.

International

 Russia - Prime Minister Dmitry Medvedev said on the day after the elections that "information on results of the elections demonstrates the people of that country are looking for changes. If those results become a reality – Georgia’s political landscape will be more versatile. This is only positive, as, most likely, this means more constructive and responsible forces will appear in the parliament. United Russia, being the leading political force in Russia, is ready for a dialogue on future of the Russia-Georgia relations".

Russian Foreign Ministry’s spokesman Alexander Lukashevich said "I hope for constructive changes to let us normalise the relations. We will be judging not by statements, but by deeds”. At the same time, he warned Georgia’s new ruling power that Russia was not going to hold any negotiations on the law on "occupied territories", which Georgia adopted following the 2008 South Ossetia war. Lukashevich said that Russia would refer to the "Republic of Abkhazia" and "Republic of Ossetia" and not use the term "occupied territories".

Chairman of the State Duma’s Committee on the CIS and compatriots Leonid Slutsky said "Georgia’s parliament will be managed by people, who oppose the present regime of Mikheil Saakashvili, and there is hope of a positive element in relations between Russia and Georgia."

References

Georgia
Parliamentary election
Parliamentary elections in Georgia (country)
Election and referendum articles with incomplete results